The Molen van Vledder is a smock mill in Vledder, Drenthe, which is used as holiday accommodation. The mill was built in 1968 and is listed as a Rijksmonument, number 357823.

History
A mill stood on this site until 1958. In 1968, the present mill was built by millwright J D Medendorp of Zuidlaren, incorporating parts from two demolished mills. The 1877-built drainage mill De Kooi, Kantens, Groningen which had been demolished in 1961 and the 1862-built drainage mill Gebroeders Bos, which stood at Hoogkerk, Groningen and was demolished in 1963. The mill is used as a holiday home.

Description

The Molen van Vledder is what the Dutch describe as an "achtkante stellingmolen". It is a two-storey smock mill with a stage on a three-storey brick base. The smock and cap are thatched. The mill is winded by a tailpole and winch. The windshaft also carries the brake wheel which has 31 cogs. This drives the wallower (24 cogs) at the top of the upright shaft. At the bottom of the upright shaft, the great spur wheel, which has 58 cogs, drives the  diameter French Burr stones via a lantern pinion stone nut with 31 staves.

References

Windmills in Drenthe
Smock mills in the Netherlands
Windmills completed in 1968
Rijksmonuments in Drenthe
Octagonal buildings in the Netherlands
Westerveld